Maja Sokač (née Zebić; born 31 May 1982) is a Croatian handballer playing in the left wing position for the Croatian national team and Ankara Yenimahalle.

Club career
Sokač started to play handball in Croatian club Sinj. In 1996, she joined senior team of Split Kaltenberg who competed in first Croatian league. In 2004, she joined Lokomotiva Zagreb, and same season she transferred to Podravka Vegeta. Besides winning many Croatian Championship and Croatian Cup trophies, she played in Cup Winners' Cup finals in 2005 and EHF Cup finals in 2006. In Champions League she played 44 matches and scored 131 goals. In the 2011/2012 season Sokač played for Spanish Champions and Champions League runners-up SD Itxako.

Trophies
Spanish Supercup
Gold: 2008/2009
Women's Regional Handball League
Gold: 2008/2009
Silver: 2009/2010, 2010/2011
Croatian Championship
Gold: 2004/2005, 2005/2006, 2006/2007, 2007/2008, 2008/2009, 2009/2010 and 2010/2011
Croatian Cup
Gold: 2004/2005, 2005/2006, 2006/2007, 2007/2008, 2008/2009, 2009/2010 and 2010/2011

References

External links
 Interview with Maja Zebić on official site of RK Podravka

1982 births
Living people
Croatian female handball players
Croatian expatriate sportspeople in Spain
Olympic handball players of Croatia
Handball players at the 2012 Summer Olympics
Sportspeople from Split, Croatia
Mediterranean Games medalists in handball
Mediterranean Games bronze medalists for Croatia
Competitors at the 2005 Mediterranean Games
RK Podravka Koprivnica players